Roberto Romano (born October 26, 1962) is a Canadian-born Italian former ice hockey goaltender. He played 126 games in the National Hockey League with the Pittsburgh Penguins and Boston Bruins between 1982 and 1994. He also played several years in the Italian Serie A. Internationally Romano played for the Italian national team at the 1992 World Championships.

Playing career
Romano played major junior with the Quebec Remparts and Hull Olympiques. He started his National Hockey League career with the Pittsburgh Penguins in 1982. During his career, he also played for the Boston Bruins. He retired after the 1994 season.

International
Romano has Italian citizenship and played for the Italian national ice hockey team at the 1992 World Ice Hockey Championships. He played in 3 games.

Career statistics

Regular season and playoffs

International

External links
 

1962 births
Living people
Baltimore Skipjacks players
Bolzano HC players
Boston Bruins players
Canadian expatriate ice hockey players in Italy
Canadian ice hockey goaltenders
Canadian people of Italian descent
Cleveland Lumberjacks players
HC Merano players
Hull Olympiques players
Ice hockey people from Montreal
Italian ice hockey goaltenders
Maine Mariners players
Moncton Golden Flames players
Pittsburgh Penguins players
Quebec Remparts players
Undrafted National Hockey League players